National Development Party can refer to:
National Development Party (Bahamas)
National Development Party (Brunei)
National Development Party (Burma)
National Development Party (Kenya)
National Development Party (Montserrat)
National Development Party (Syria)
National Development Party (Thailand)
National Development Party (Trinidad and Tobago)
National Development Party (Turkey)
Rastriya Bikas Party (Nepal)